The Moderate Coalition for Åland (MS) is a liberal-conservative political party in Åland.

History
The MS was formed by a merger of the Moderates of Åland and the Non-aligned Coalition (ObS), although not all members of the ObS agreed with the move, and the party continued to exist.

The party received 17.8% of the vote in the 2015 elections, winning five of the 30 seats in Parliament.

References

External links
Official website

Political parties in Åland
Liberal conservative parties
Conservative parties in Finland
Liberal parties in Finland